Donald M. Kendrick (born 1947) is the Calgary, Alberta-born director of choral activities at California State University, Sacramento (CSUS)  and the director of music at Sacred Heart Church where he conducts Schola Cantorum and Vox Nova (Men's Chorus), and the founder and artistic director of the Sacramento Choral Society and Orchestra (a 200 voice volunteer/auditioned symphony chorus and professional orchestra). He is also the founder and past artistic director of the Sacramento Children's Chorus.

Life

Kendrick taught, led choirs and played the organ in Regina, Saskatchewan, where he was on the faculty at the then-University of Saskatchewan, Regina Campus, was the organist and choirmaster at St. Paul's Cathedral (Regina), the Anglican Cathedral in that city, and led the choral section of the summer arts school at Fort San, Saskatchewan, was organist and choirmaster at Christ's Church Anglican Cathedral in Hamilton, Ontario where he conducted the Bach-Elgar Choir, and established the Hamilton Children's Choir.  He also conducted the Canadian Children's Opera Chorus.

Kendrick holds academic qualifications from: 
the American Conservatory of Music in Chicago,
the New England Conservatory of Music in Boston,
Stanford University and the
Eastman School of Music whose doctorate he holds, as well as the American Guild of Organists CHM (choirmaster) certificate, and received the American Choral Federation in New York’s Louise Rogers Goucher Memorial Scholarship.

He has been on the faculties of 
 the University of Saskatchewan, Regina Campus
 the Eastman School of Music
 Louisiana State University
 the University of the Pacific Conservatory of Music
 The New York Philharmonic
 Harvard University

Guest appearances and tours

Kendrick debuted in Carnegie Hall with the Verdi Requiem in 1995 and has frequently been featured on Canadian Broadcasting Corporation radio as a recitalist and conductor; he has been active as a guest conductor and adjudicator for choral festivals throughout Canada and the USA. At the California State University, Sacramento he directs the graduate degree program in choral conducting.

Kendrick has taken his CSUS choirs on three Canadian tours. In July 2004 he combined the CSUS program with the Sacramento Choral Society and conducted a European tour performing in Munich, Prague, Vienna and Budapest. In July 2006 the Sacramento Choral Society made its debut in the People's Republic of China, performing in Tianjin, Beijing, Xi'an and Jinan.

Notes

External links
Biography and photo at Schola Cantorum

1947 births
Living people
Male conductors (music)
California State University, Sacramento faculty
21st-century Canadian conductors (music)
21st-century Canadian male musicians